Luccombe is a hamlet a short distance south of Shanklin, on the south coast of the Isle of Wight, England.

There is some indication of Bronze Age settlements on the top of the nearby hill of Luccombe Down.

The Luccombe area features spectacular cliffs and scenery. It is a popular site for hang gliding and paragliding if there is an easterly wind of around 12 mph and it is low water, and on good days flights to Sandown and back can be achieved.

Luccombe forms the east end of the Ventnor Undercliff region, which extends for 12 kilometers from Blackgang to Luccombe, also encompassing the town of Ventnor and the villages of Bonchurch, St Lawrence, and Niton. There is some concern that the Ventnor Undercliff area is experiencing substantial coastal erosion.

Public transport is provided by Southern Vectis bus route 3, which runs between Newport, Ryde, Sandown, Shanklin and Ventnor.

References

Hamlets on the Isle of Wight
Shanklin